Laura Soveral (23 March 1933 in Benguela, Angola – 12 July 2018) was a Portuguese actress. She performed in more than seventy films from 1966.

Selected filmography

References

External links

Portuguese film actresses
1933 births
2018 deaths
People from Benguela
20th-century Portuguese actresses
21st-century Portuguese actresses